Agostino "Dino" De Laurentiis (8 August 1919 – 10 November 2010) was an Italian and American film producer. Along with Carlo Ponti, he was one of the producers who brought Italian cinema to the international scene at the end of World War II. He produced or co-produced more than 500 films, of which 38 were nominated for Academy Awards. He also had a brief acting career in the late 1930s and early 1940s.

Early life
De Laurentiis was born at Torre Annunziata in the province of Naples, and grew up selling spaghetti made by his father's pasta factory. He studied at the Centro Sperimentale di Cinematografia in Rome in 1937 and 1938, when his studies were interrupted by the outbreak of World War II.

Career

Film production
De Laurentiis produced his first film, L'ultimo Combattimento, in 1941. In 1946 his company, the Dino de Laurentiis Cinematografica, moved into production. In the early years, De Laurentiis produced Italian neorealist films such as Bitter Rice (1949) and the early Fellini works La Strada (1954) and Nights of Cabiria (1956), often in collaboration with producer Carlo Ponti. 

In the 1960s, Laurentiis built his own studio facilities. He produced such films as Barabbas (1961), a Christian religious epic; The Bible: In the Beginning... (1966); Kiss the Girls and Make Them Die, an imitation James Bond film; Navajo Joe (1966), a spaghetti Western; Anzio (1968), a World War II film; Barbarella (1968) and Danger: Diabolik (1968), both successful comic book adaptations; and The Valachi Papers (1972), released before its originally scheduled date in order to capitalize on the popularity of The Godfather. His studio financially collapsed during the 1970s.

De Laurentiis moved to the U.S. in 1976, and became an American citizen in 1986. In the 1980s he had his own studio, De Laurentiis Entertainment Group (DEG), based in Wilmington, North Carolina. The building of the studio made Wilmington a center of film and television production. In 1990, De Laurentiis obtained backing from an Italian friend and formed another company, Dino De Laurentiis Communications in Beverly Hills.

De Laurentiis made a number of successful and/or acclaimed films, including The Scientific Cardplayer (1972), Serpico (1973), Death Wish (1974), Mandingo (1975), Three Days of the Condor (1975), The Shootist (1976), Drum (1976), Ingmar Bergman's The Serpent's Egg (1977), Ragtime (1981), Conan the Barbarian (1982), Blue Velvet (1986) and Breakdown (1997). De Laurentiis' name became well known through the 1976 King Kong remake, which was a commercial hit; Lipstick (1976), a rape and revenge drama; Orca (1977), a killer whale film; The White Buffalo (1977), a western; the disaster movie Hurricane (1979); the remake of Flash Gordon (1980);  David Lynch's Dune (1984); and King Kong Lives (1986). De Laurentiis also produced several adaptations of Stephen King works, including The Dead Zone (1983), Cat's Eye (1985), Silver Bullet (1985), and Maximum Overdrive (1986). De Laurentiis's company was involved with the horror sequels Halloween II (1981), Evil Dead II (1987) and Army of Darkness (1992).

De Laurentiis also produced the first Hannibal Lecter film, Manhunter (1986), an adaptation of the Thomas Harris novel Red Dragon. He passed on adapting the novels' sequel, The Silence of the Lambs (1991), but produced the two follow-ups, Hannibal (2001) and Red Dragon (2002), a re-adaptation of the novel. He also produced the prequel Hannibal Rising (2007), which tells the story of how Hannibal becomes a serial killer.

DDL Foodshow
DDL Foodshow was an Italian specialty foods store with the three locations, two in New York City and one in Beverly Hills in Los Angeles. They were opened in the early 1980s and owned and operated by De Laurentiis.

The first store was opened in the restored palm court in the ornate lobby of the Endicott Hotel on Manhattan's Upper West Side in close proximity to the older establishment, Zabar's food emporium on Broadway. The first NYC store opened in November 1982, and it was reported that the store "opened to crowds of 30,000 over the Thanksgiving weekend, when de Laurentiis himself greeted customers at the door." The store's assistant manager said that "it was like the premiere of a movie."

Food critic Gael Greene wrote a scathing review on the opening in New York. In an interview with the Chicago Tribune a month later, she admitted that the store was "probably the most stunningly handsome grocery in the world, certainly in New York," but "the pricing was insane. They hadn't paid enough attention to the competition." She reported that she'd talked to De Laurentiis: "Dino's reaction was that I'm full of it. And we're meeting over a bowl of pasta to discuss it." A review in The San Francisco Examiner said that it was "worth a peek and a purchase."

DDL Foodshow was later considered to be a forebear of the new Italian specialty goods food-store restaurant dining attraction Eataly.

Family
His brief first marriage in Italy was annulled. In 1949, De Laurentiis married actress Silvana Mangano, with whom he had four children: Veronica; Raffaella, who is also a film producer; Federico De Laurentiis, his only son, a producer who died in a plane crash in 1981 (Dino's movie Dune is dedicated to him); and Francesca. De Laurentiis and Mangano divorced in 1988; she died in 1989. In 1990, he married Martha Schumacher, who produced many of his films beginning in 1985, and with whom he had two daughters, Carolyna and Dina. One of his grandchildren is Giada De Laurentiis, host of Everyday Italian, Behind the Bash, Giada at Home, and Giada's Weekend Getaways on Food Network. He was the younger brother of Luigi De Laurentiis, who became a film producer after Dino had done so, and uncle of Aurelio De Laurentiis, also a producer, and the chairman of S.S.C. Napoli football club.

Awards and recognitions
In 1958, he won the Academy Award for Best Foreign Film for producing La Strada. At the time producers and directors would win the award instead of the country it was made in.

In 2001, he received the Irving G. Thalberg Memorial Award from the Academy of Motion Picture Arts and Sciences.

In 2012, he received the America Award of the Italy-USA Foundation (in memory).

Death
De Laurentiis died on 10 November 2010 at his residence in Beverly Hills at the age of 91.

Filmography
Films produced

References

External links

 Dino De Laurentiis Company Official site
 
 Who Was Dino De Laurentiis? – image slideshow by Life magazine

1919 births
2010 deaths
People from Torre Annunziata
Italian film producers
American film producers
Italian emigrants to the United States
Centro Sperimentale di Cinematografia alumni
David di Donatello winners
David di Donatello Career Award winners
Nastro d'Argento winners
Recipients of the Irving G. Thalberg Memorial Award
Dino